Cyber Seduction: His Secret Life is a 2005 American psychological drama made-for-television film about a teenage boy whose life goes downhill after he develops an addiction to internet pornography. The film was directed by Tom McLoughlin, and stars Jeremy Sumpter in the main role, with co-actors including Kelly Lynch, Jake Scott and Lyndsy Fonseca. It received no notable critical reviews initially, but in the 2010s became considered a stereotypical example of Lifetime Movie Network films after renewed attention to the title, and it received an unexpected cult following.

Plot
Justin Petersen is a teenage boy and high school athlete, hoping to earn a college scholarship by getting a spot on the swim team. Increasing pressure from his mother, Diane (who was a competitive swimmer herself as a teenager) pushes him into extracurricular activities alongside his already hectic schedule. Justin is awkward and a virgin, but he does have a girlfriend, Amy, a devout Christian who covets her own virginity and wants Justin to wait for sex until marriage, too. The pair are confused by their male friends' fascination with "porn parties" at a local boy's basement, in which kids gather to drink alcohol and watch internet porn. Justin notices Monica, the school slut, who repeatedly flirts with him, but he ignores her for the most part. Monica constantly wears too-small shirts that display her midriff, and she mocks Amy's taste in religious rock music. Increasingly fascinated by porn, however, Justin begins downloading it and visiting websites for it on his desktop computer. Diane catches him, and in horror, she asks her husband, Richard, to tell Justin about sex and female respect. The subject matter confuses Justin, who makes increased efforts to hide his downloaded porn. Staying up all night to look at it, he consumes energy drinks to wake himself up in the morning, but begins to fail his swim practices, observing porn on Amy's palm pilot when nobody's looking. He also sees Diane in the swimming pool, and despite her being his mother, he fantasizes about her sexually, as well as other girls in his school.

Alex, Justin's little brother, finds the porn on Justin's computer and is so traumatized by it that he cannot speak at dinner. Later, Diane catches Alex with a CD labelled "Virgin Vaginas" with a permanent marker, and she realizes that Justin is not only still looking at porn, but also sharing it with Alex. Justin fails an important swim meet, gets a detention for looking up porn on a school computer, and is kicked off the swim team, ruining his chances at a scholarship. His relationship with Amy suffers as he tries to force himself on her, angering her, and his teammates mock and bully him after he is caught looking up BDSM porn on a friend's home computer. Fearful of scrutiny, he frequents internet cafes for porn, while Diane's best friend cautions her that Justin has an addiction to it. Justin meets up with Monica, but the whole situation is awkward; Monica insists on having sex in a bed that appears to belong to her grandparents, with a photo of them on the adjacent wall. Terrified at the prospect of real sex, Justin flees, and Monica is revealed to be emotionally disturbed. She hits her head violently against a porcelain bathroom sink, leaving a bloody gash which she claims Justin caused, and a group of boys jump him on the way home, beating him up badly. Forlorn, Justin breaks into the high school at night and sneaks into the swimming pool, flopping in and attempting to drown himself. Thinking back to his family, to Amy and to his swim team, he is unable to bring himself to do it, and he rises from the water, raising his fist in the air and swimming with a smile on his face.

Cast
 Jeremy Sumpter as Justin Petersen
 Kelly Lynch as Diane Petersen
 Jake Scott as Alex Petersen
 John Robinson as Richard Petersen
 Lyndsy Fonseca as Amy
 Nicole Dicker as Monica
 Kyle Schmidt as Timmy
 Briony Glassco as Beth
 Benz Antoine as Coach Suha

Reception
Cyber Seduction: His Secret Life received a cult following after its release. Yvette Del Rio of Movies of Our Lifetime rated the film 10/10 because she found it unintentionally comedic; she noted elements such as Justin's internet username being "Stroke Man" and called the film "one of those Lifetime Classics, up there with Mother May I Sleep With Danger?." The A.V. Club added the film to its list of best introductory Lifetime movies to watch, stating, "this is the kind of movie designed to make worried moms search their sons’ web histories, and those sons giggle because seriously, who has a PDA anymore?". USA Today added the film to a list of Lifetime movies beloved to "hate-watch", mockingly saying of it, "OF COURSE the best freestyle swimmer in the whole state has a porn addiction! And OF COURSE it leads him down a path of betrayal, violent attacks, depression and probation! What better, more realistic plot to a story is there?!" Mustafa Gatollari of Distractify considered Cyber Seduction: His Secret Life a classic example of "ridiculously bad" Lifetime movies, noting it for its unintentional humor.

References

External links

2005 television films
2005 films
2005 drama films
2000s American films
2000s coming-of-age drama films
2000s English-language films
2000s teen drama films
American coming-of-age drama films
American drama television films
American teen drama films
Films about the Internet
Films about pornography
Films about sex addiction
Films about virginity
Films directed by Tom McLoughlin
Films scored by Louis Febre
Lifetime (TV network) films
Teensploitation